Elections were held in the organized municipalities in the Manitoulin District of Ontario on October 27, 2014 in conjunction with municipal elections across the province.

Assiginack

Billings

Burpee and Mills

Central Manitoulin

Cockburn Island

Gordon/Barrie Island

Gore Bay

Northeastern Manitoulin and the Islands

Tehkummah

References
Results

Manitoulin
Manitoulin District